The Historic Firehouses of Louisville is a Thematic Resource (TR) Multiple Property Submission (MPS) on the National Register of Historic Places.  The submission represents 18 historic fire stations, located in Louisville, Kentucky, which were added to the National Register in 1980–81 due to their historical and architectural merits.

History of firefighting in Louisville
Louisville's first fire brigades were established in 1780, two years after the city's creation. The first firehouses were volunteer fire departments scattered throughout the city, but on June 1, 1858 the city of Louisville took control, and replaced the hand engines with five steam engines and volunteers with paid staff.  There were initially three fire stations, 65 professional firefighters, and 23 horses.

Many of the early firehouses were demolished due to urban renewal; the oldest firehouse still standing was originally built as St. John's Church in 1848, but the city turned the two-story edifice of brick and cast iron located in Phoenix Hill into a firehouse in 1869.   Three additional remaining firehouses were built in the 1870s and 1880s (Steam Engine Co. #7 in Limerick (1871), Steam Engine Co. #10 in Butchertown (1873), and the Rogers Street Firehouse in Irish Hill (1883)).

Formed on October 7, 1871, as the Louisville Steam Engine Co. 7, Engine Company 7, at 6th & York Streets, is the oldest continuously operated firehouse in the United States.  Due to budget concerns, it is scheduled to close in January 2009, in hopes to save $543,000 from the city's budget.

The most prominent of the firehouses built in the 1890s was the Fire Department Headquarters built in Downtown Louisville at 617 W. Jefferson Street in 1891.  It is Richardsonian Romanesque in style, as it was designed by the McDonald Brothers, who also designed the Kentucky National Bank and Norton's Warehouse buildings in downtown Louisville.

The current fire department headquarters, at 1135 W. Jefferson Street (just outside downtown Louisville), was built in 1936 by the WPA.  This limestone edifice is one of the few buildings in Louisville built in the Art Deco style. When the fire department moved out, the former headquarters became home to the police traffic bureau and eventually became the Louisville Sinking Fund Building.

Firehouses

See also
Louisville Division of Fire
List of fire stations (worldwide)

References

External links
Steam Engine Co. #7's MySpace page

National Register of Historic Places in Louisville, Kentucky
Defunct fire stations in Kentucky
Fire stations on the National Register of Historic Places in Kentucky
Lists of buildings and structures in Kentucky
Firefighting-related lists
Lists of government buildings in the United States
Government of Louisville, Kentucky